Gen. Nga Lon Letpe (Ngaloun Lekphay) was one of the Four Paladins of King Anawrahta during the Pagan Dynasty. He was formerly a simple farmer from Popa region, and could plough a large-scale farm by driving 60 oxen single-handedly in one morning. He was later knighted by Anawrahta and served as a leading general of the Royal Army.

He, along with his iconic horse "Le-mo-thae-khaung" is remembered as the epitome of physical might and farming in popular culture today.

References

Burmese generals